The year 628 BC was a year of the pre-Julian Roman calendar. In the Roman Empire, it was known as year 126 Ab urbe condita . The denomination 628 BC for this year has been used since the early medieval period, when the Anno Domini calendar era became the prevalent method in Europe for naming years.

Events
 Traditional date of the foundation of Selinus by Megara Hyblaea.

Births
 Zoroaster, Persian religious prophet

Deaths
 Duke Wen of Jin, ruler of the state of Jin

References